Patience is the 13th studio album by Peter Hammill. It was released in August 1983 on Naive Records, a label founded by Gordian Troeller, the former manager of Hammill's band Van der Graaf Generator. It was remastered in 1991 and released on Fie! Records. It was the second album to feature the collective known as the “K Group” (the first was Enter K) — Hammill, drummer Guy Evans and bassist Nic Potter (Hammill's former colleagues in VdGG), and guitarist John Ellis (of The Vibrators and Peter Gabriel’s band).

Patience reached #15 in the UK Indie Chart.

The members of K Group adopted aliases during their time in the 
band. Hammill was "K", Evans was "Brain", Ellis was "Fury",Potter was "Mozart".

"Patient", "Traintime" and "Comfortable" have all been played regularly by Hammill in live performance in recent years.

"Just Good Friends" was re-worked for Hammill's 1984 album The Love Songs.

Track listing
All songs written by Peter Hammill.
"Labour of Love" – 5:52
"Film Noir" – 4:16
"Just Good Friends" – 4:26
"Jeunesse d'Orée" – 4:45
"Traintime" – 4:25
"Now More Than Ever" – 5:36
"Comfortable?" – 4:54
"Patient" – 6:14

Personnel
Peter Hammill – vocals, piano, acoustic and electric guitar
Guy Evans – drums, percussion
Nic Potter – bass
John Ellis – guitar

Additional musicians
David Jackson – saxophone and panpipes on 1 and 7
Stuart Gordon – violin on 3
David Lord – Prophet 5 on 3

Technical
David Lord – recording engineer, mixing (Crescent Studios, Bath)

References

External links 

 Lyrics on Hammill's Sofa Sound website

Peter Hammill albums
1983 albums